Hilyat al-Awliya' wa Tabaqat al-Asfiya', is a biographical encyclopaedic book authored by Abu Nu'aym al-Isfahani. It provides a glance of the lives of more than 200 saints from the first three generations of Muslims (pious predecessors).

Content

The Hilyat al-Awliya' is recognized as one of the most important sources for the early development of Sufism, as it contains the largest known collection of biographies of Sufis. It consists of 689 biographies in ten volumes (approx. 4,000 pages). They include, in roughly chronological order: the first generation of Muslims specifically the four rightly guided caliphs, the first six Imams according to the Shia theology, the eponymous founders of the three of the four major Sunni schools of jurisprudence, theologians and pious people known for their ascetism, piety and mysticism. This book also collects hadith from the companions and has become an important reference for the later hadith scholars. The author gets involved in sensitive subjects and refutes heresy that contradict the tenets of the Islamic faith.

Abridgement
Ibn al-Jawzi criticized the author for including the Companions of the Prophet, so then he went on to make his own version of book in two volumes entitled Sifat al-Safwa, in it he attempts to avoid the words using "Sufi" or "Tasawwuf.

Reception
Al-Dhahabi said: "We have never written such a book as Hilyat al-Awliya'".

It was related that Hilyat al-Awliya was among one of Imam Taqi al-Din al-Subki's favourite books.

See also 

 Al-Risala al-Qushayriyya
 List of Sunni books

References

11th-century Arabic books
Hadith
Sufi literature
Sunni literature
Encyclopedias
Books of Islamic biography